Krumovo is a village in the Plovdiv Province, southern Bulgaria named after the Bulgarian Khan Krum. As of 2006 it has 3,378 inhabitants. The village is located at 2 km to the south of the Maritsa river and at 12 km to the south-east of Plovdiv. The Plovdiv International Airport is located in the vicinity of the village. It is also famous for its grapes sort Krumovski mavrud.
Every 2 years the BIAF Airshow is held on the Krumovo Airbase, resulting in heavy parking problems in the village.

External links
 Krumovo Official Site

Villages in Plovdiv Province